Eternal Nightmare is the fifth studio album by American deathcore band Chelsea Grin. It was released on July 13, 2018. It is the first album from the band without either frontman Alex Koehler and guitarists Jacob Harmond and Dan Jones. The departure of the three also makes this release the first to not feature any founding members. It is also the first album that Chelsea Grin has recorded as a four-piece band, with ex-Lorna Shore vocalist Tom Barber joining the band on vocal duties. On April 27, 2018, Koehler confirmed this as well as his new solo act, Grudges, and Chelsea Grin released the lead single from the album, named "Dead Rose". The second single, "Hostage", was released on June 1, 2018. The third single, "See You Soon" was released on June 14, 2018. This is the last album to be released by Rise Records.

Track listing

Personnel 
Chelsea Grin
 Tom Barber – lead vocals
 Stephen Rutishauser – guitars
 David Flinn – bass
 Pablo Viveros – drums, vocals

Production
 Drew Fulk – production, composing, mixing, mastering
 Jeff Dunne – engineering, editing, mixing, mastering
 Joshua Travis – additional production and engineering
 Afif Andriansyah – cover art

Charts

References 

2018 albums
Chelsea Grin albums
Rise Records albums